Kozia Góra may refer to the following places:
Kozia Góra, Łódź Voivodeship (central Poland)
Kozia Góra, Lublin Voivodeship (east Poland)
Kozia Góra, Pomeranian Voivodeship (north Poland)
Kozia Góra, Warmian-Masurian Voivodeship (north Poland)